Sapyorny is a municipal settlement in Kolpinsky District of the federal city of St. Petersburg, Russia. Population:

References

Municipal settlements under jurisdiction of Saint Petersburg
Kolpinsky District